Seven Angry Men is a 1955 American Western film directed by Charles Marquis Warren and starring Raymond Massey, Debra Paget and Jeffrey Hunter.

It is about the abolitionist John Brown, particularly his involvement in Bleeding Kansas and his leadership of the Raid on Harpers Ferry. The title refers to Brown and his six sons.

Plot summary
John Brown (Raymond Massey) is a 19th-century abolitionist. After cutting a bloody swath through Kansas, Brown and his followers take refuge in a warehouse at Harper's Ferry, Virginia, where he meets his own personal Waterloo at the hands of federal troops.

Cast
 Raymond Massey as John Brown
 Debra Paget as Elizabeth Clark
 Jeffrey Hunter as Owen Brown
 Larry Pennell as Oliver Brown
 Leo Gordon as Martin White
 John Smith as Frederick Brown
 James Best as Jason Beown
 Dennis Weaver as John Brown Jr.
 Guy Williams as Salmon Brown
 Tom Irish as Watson Brown
 James Anderson as Henry Thompson
 James Edwards as Ned Green
 John Pickard as George Wilson
 Smoki Whitfield as Newby
 Jack Lomas as Doyle
 Robert Simon as Lewis Washington
 Richard H. Cutting as Maj. Beckham (uncredited) 
 Lester Dorr as Henry David Thoreau (uncredited) 
 Selmer Jackson as Ralph Waldo Emerson (uncredited) 
 John Lupton as J.E.B. Stuart (uncredited)
 Robert Osterloh as Robert E. Lee (uncredited)
 Carleton Young as Judge (uncredited)

Production
Raymond Massey had previously played Brown in Santa Fe Trail (1940) and appeared on stage in John Brown's Body.

The film was known as John Brown's Raiders. In July 1954 Walter Mirisch announced the film would be one of 15 Allied Artists would make over the next 6 months. The same month the studio announced that Massey would play Brown.

Hunter and Paget were borrowed from 20th Century Fox. Filming started in September 1954.

Reception
The New York Times critic called it a "competent if hardly inspired Allied Artists presentation".

See also
List of American films of 1955
List of films featuring slavery

References

External links 
 
 
 
 
 Archive.org Copy of Film

1955 films
American biographical films
American black-and-white films
Allied Artists films
Films set in the 1850s
American historical films
1950s historical films
Films directed by Charles Marquis Warren
Films set in Kansas
Films set in Virginia
Cultural depictions of John Brown (abolitionist)
Cultural depictions of Robert E. Lee
1950s English-language films
1950s American films
American Western (genre) films
1955 Western (genre) films